Pasiphila bilineolata is a moth in the family Geometridae. It is endemic to New Zealand and can be found in the North and South Islands. The species inhabits native forest and shrubland and the larvae feed on Hebe species. Adults are on the wing commonly from August to January but have been observed most months of the year and are attracted to light.

Taxonomy 
This species was first described by Francis Walker in 1862 and named Eupithecia bilineolata. Walker used a specimen collected by T. R. Oxley in Nelson. In 1888 Edward Meyrick placed this species in the genus Pasiphila. In 1898 and again in 1928 George Hudson discussed and illustrated this species under the name Chloroclystis bilineolata. In 1971 John S. Dugdale placed this species back in the genus Pasiphila. In 1988 Dugdale confirmed this placement and also synonymised Chloroclystis lacustris, Chloroclystis paralodes and Chloroclystis zatricha with this species. Robert Hoare, in the New Zealand Inventory of Biodiversity, followed this placement. The female holotype specimen is held at the Natural History Museum, London.

Description

Walker described the species as follows:

The forewings are bright green with numerous wavy darker lines. The hindwings are grey, slightly tinged with reddish. Adults are on wing from September to May.

Distribution 
This species is endemic to New Zealand. This species has been observed in the North and South Islands.

Behaviour 
This species is on the wing mainly from August to January but observations have also been recorded in February, April, May and June. This species is attracted to light.

Habitat and hosts

The larvae feed on the flowers and foliage of Hebe species. Adults of this species inhabit native forest and shrublands. Adult moths have been observed feeding on the flowers of Dracophyllum acerosum, Dracophyllum uniflorum and Veronica salicifolia.

References

Moths described in 1862
bilineolata
Moths of New Zealand
Endemic fauna of New Zealand
Taxa named by Francis Walker (entomologist)
Endemic moths of New Zealand